Arunachal Frontier Highway (AFH), officially notified as the National Highway NH-913 and also called Bomdila-Vijaynagar Highway (BVH), connecting Bomdila Airstrip ALG & HQ in northwest to Vijaynagar Airstrip ALG & HQ in southeast via Nafra HQ-Sarli HQ-Huri Helipad ALG & HQ-Nacho HQ-Mechuka Airstrip ALG & HQ-Monigong HQ-Jido (Tuting Airstrip ALG & HQ)-Hunli HQ-Hayuliang Airstrip ALG HQ-Chenquenty-Hawai HQ-Miao HQ (with Miao-Kharsang HQ spur) including 800 km greenfield section and network of new tunnels & bridges, is a 2-lane paved-shoulder under-construction national highway along the India-China LAC-McMahon Line border in the Indian state of Arunachal Pradesh. In some places, this highway will run as close as 20 km from the LAC. To be constructed by MoRTH in 9 packages, all packages will be approved by the end of fy 2024-25 (March 2025) and construction will be completed in 2 years by 31 March 2027. This highway in the north & east Arunachal along the China border, would complement the Trans-Arunachal Highway (through the middle of Arunachal) and the Arunachal East-West Corridor (in south Arunachal in foothills along the Assam border) as major highways spanning the whole state, pursuing the Look East connectivity policy.

History

In 2016, empowered committee on border infrastructure asked the MoRTH to prepare the detailed project reports (DPR) as per the alignment agreed by the home ministry, defence ministry & Arunachal state government. In 2018, Home ministry enhanced the alignment for the additional connectivity. MoRTH identifies the highway as one of the 29 corridors close to the 3,600 km international border, to be undertaken as a NHDP (which has been subsumed by the Bharatmala project), though there is "little habitation" along the proposed route and only "small stretches of minor roads".

Benefits

Various sources in the Government of India and media have mentioned the following reasons to build the highway:

 Highway will generate employment and increase tourism in these hard-to-reach areas.

 Highway will check Chinese incursions into Indian territory.  China has built an extensive road and railway network on its side, posing a security risk to India as the region is relatively inaccessible on the Indian side.

Construction

It will be constructed in nine packages, all approvals and land acquisition will be progressively completed by March 2025, and the construction will be progressively completed by March 2027.

Route alignment

The high-altitude highway will originate from Mago-Thingbu in Tawang district  and meander through the following border areas of Arunachal Pradesh along the McMahon Line:  West Kameng district; East Kameng district; Upper Subansiri district; Mechuka  in West Siang district; Tuting in Upper Siang district; Dibang Valley district; Desali in Lower Dibang Valley district; Chaglagam, Kibithu, Dong and Hawai all in Anjaw district; and end at Vijaynagar in Changlang district at the junction of Arunachal Pradesh, Assam, Nagaland and Myanmar. The map of alignment can be seen here.

Alignment by district, from west to east:

 West Kameng district (capital Bomdila) 
 Bomdila - aviation ministry is planning an airport in Dirang just northeast of Bomdila
 Thembang HQ, north of Bomdila.
 Nafra Heliport ALG & HQ, east of Thembang & Bomdila.
 Dishing, north of Nafra in Nafra circle.
 Wothung, northeast of Dishing in Nafra circle.

 East Kameng district (capital Seppa) 
 Nissangjang in Lada circle, northeast of Wothung & Nafra.
 Lada Heliport ALG & HQ, north of district HQ Seppa.
 Bameng Heliport ALG & HQ, southeast of Lada.
 Sawa Heliport ALG & HQ, northeast of Bameng
 Chayangtajo Heliport ALG & HQ, northeast of Sawa.

 Kurung Kumey district (capital Koloriang) 
 Koloriang Heliport ALG & district HQ, northeast of Chayangtajo.
 Sarli Heliport ALG & HQ, northwest of Koloriang.
 Huri Heliport ALG in Huri-Damin circle, northeast of Sarli.
 Damin Heliport ALG in Huri-Damin circle, east of Huri.

 Upper Subansiri district (capital Daporijo Airport ALG)
 Nacho Heliport ALG & HQ, northeast of Huri & Damin.

 West Siang district (capital Aalo Airport ALG)
 Monigong Heliport ALG & HQ, east of Nacho.
 Mechuka Airstrip ALG & HQ, north of Manigong.

 Upper Siang district (capital Yingkiong)
 Jido (Tuting Airstrip ALG) & HQ, east of Mechuka.
 Singa, southeast of Tuting.

 Dibang Valley district (capital Anini under-construction Airport ALG)
 Cheppe, in Anelih circle and southeast of Singa.
 Anelih HQ, southeast of Singa.

 Lower Dibang Valley district (capital Roing Airport ALG)
 Hunli Heliport ALG & HQ, southeast of Anelih.
 Desali HQ, east of Hunli.

 Anjaw district (capital Hawai)
 Hayuliang Airport ALG & HQ.
 Manchal Heliport ALG & HQ.
 Hawai Heliport ALG & HQ.

 Changlang district (capital Changlang)
 Miao HQ 
 Kharsang HQ, Miao-Kharsang spur.
 Chenquenty
 Vijaynagar Airstrip ALG, Miao-Vijaynagar route.

Spurs
Also proposed is a 100 km long western spur from Tawang to Yongphulla Airport in Bhutan (upgraded by India and jointly used by the Indian Army and Bhutan Army) in eastern Bhutan via Lumla-Yabab in India and Trashigang in Bhutan.

Six Inter-corridor highways

To providing missing interconnectivity between three horizontal national highways across Arunachal Pradesh - Frontier Highway, Trans-Arunachal Highway and East-West Industrial Corridor Highway - following six vertical and diagonal national highway corridors of total 2178 km length will be built, which will also provide faster access to geostrategically important areas on India-China LAC.

Listed west to east.

 Thelamara-Tawang-Nelia Highway: 402 km.

 Itakhola-Pakke-Kessang-Seppa-Parsi Parlo Highway: 391 km.

 Gogamukh-Taliha-Tato Highway: 285 km.

 Akajan-Jorging-Pango Highway: 398 km.
 
 Pasighat-Bishing Highway: 298 km.

 Kanubari-Longding Highway: 404 km.

Other wider connectivity

The highway will intersect with the proposed East-West Industrial Corridor Highway in the foothills of Arunachal Pradesh from Bhairabkunda, the tri-junction of Bhutan, Assam and Arunachal Pradesh to Ruksin in East Siang district.

The highway will pass through the BCIM Economic Corridor proposed by the Bangladesh-China-India-Myanmar Forum for Regional Cooperation (BCIM Forum), a multi-mode corridor that includes a highway from Calcutta in India's West Bengal state to Kunming in China's Yunnan province. As well as Arunachal Pradesh, the highway passes through the Indian states of Manipur and Assam.

The highway will cross the Dibang Wildlife Sanctuary, which may raise environmental issues.

Current status

 2014 Oct: Kiren Rijiju, Union Minister of State for Home Affairs stated that the BJP-led government sought to expedite this project, as well as the proposed East-West Industrial Corridor Highway, with the coordinated efforts of BRO, MinDef, Government of Arunachal Pradesh, MoRTH, DoNER and NSA.

 2016 Dec: Govt asked MoRTH to undertake route survey and prepare the DPR.

 2022 Nov-Dec: Construction already commenced on 192 km and the whole highway route notified as the National Highway NH-913. MoRTH announced that all approvals and land acquisition will be progressively completed by March 2025, and the construction will be progressively completed by March 2027 in the overlapping phases.

See also
 Arunachal Pradesh connectivity projects
 Bhalukpong-Tawang railway, under-construction 
 Arunachal East-West Corridor, across foothills of lower upper Arunachal Pradesh
 Trans-Arunachal Highway, exiting operational highway
 India-China Border Roads

 Northeast connectivity projects
 Northeast Connectivity projects
 Look-East Connectivity projects
 North-South and East-West Corridor
 India-Myanmar-Thailand Friendship Highway
 BCIM Economic Corridor
 Asian Highway Network
 List of bridges on Brahmaputra River

 National highways
 List of National Highways in India (by Highway Number)
 List of National Highways in India
 National Highways Development Project
 Expressways of India
 Golden Quadrilateral (GQ)

References

Proposed roads in India
Proposed infrastructure in Arunachal Pradesh
Transport in Arunachal Pradesh
Roads in Arunachal Pradesh
Modi administration initiatives